In enzymology, a -mannitol oxidase is an enzyme that catalyzes the chemical reaction

mannitol + O2  mannose + H2O2

Thus, the two substrates of this enzyme are mannitol and O2, whereas its two products are mannose and H2O2.

This enzyme belongs to the family of oxidoreductases, specifically those acting on the CH-OH group of donor with oxygen as acceptor.  The systematic name of this enzyme class is mannitol:oxygen oxidoreductase (cyclizing). Other names in common use include mannitol oxidase, and D-arabitol oxidase.

References

 
 

EC 1.1.3
Enzymes of unknown structure